Craig Thomas Lynch (born 25 March 1992) is an English former professional footballer who played as a striker. He is currently manager of Morpeth Town.

Playing career

Sunderland
Born in Chester-le-Street, County Durham, Lynch turned professional in 2010 after two seasons in Sunderland's academy. In 2008, Lynch signed his first professional contract with the club.

He was called up into the first team in April 2011, and made his professional debut on 30 April, coming on as a substitute in their 3–0 home loss to Fulham in the Premier League. Two months later in July, Lynch signed a two-year contract with the club.

Under the management of Martin O'Neill, it announced that Lynch go out on loan to gain first team experience. On 8 September 2012, he joined Football League One side Hartlepool United on a one-month loan deal. Lynch scored his first goal for the club, in a 3–1 loss against Colchester United on 27 September 2012. Despite losing 3–1, Manager Neale Cooper praised Lynch performance, as well as, his goal. After making six appearances and scoring once, Lynch returned to his parent club after spending one month at Hartlepool United.

Rochdale
On 18 February 2014, Lynch joined Rochdale following his release from Sunderland.

On 3 May 2014, Lynch made his only appearance for Rochdale, coming on as substitute on the 56th minute of the final game of the season, a 2–1 defeat away at Newport County. Lynch was among released at the end of the season.

Non-League
After being released by Rochdale, Lynch moved to Spennymoor Town of the Northern Premier League Division One North on 8 August 2014.

On 5 February 2015, Blyth Spartans announced the signing of Lynch. In November 2015 he joined Seaham Red Star.

Managerial career
In February 2018 Lynch was appointed manager of Seaham Red Star.

In June 2018 Lynch joined Morpeth Town as assistant manager. In September 2021 he was appointed caretaker manager of Morpeth. He was given the job permanently the following month.

Career statistics

References

External links
Sunderland profile

1992 births
Living people
Sportspeople from Chester-le-Street
Footballers from County Durham
English footballers
Association football forwards
Sunderland A.F.C. players
Hartlepool United F.C. players
Rochdale A.F.C. players
Spennymoor Town F.C. players
Blyth Spartans A.F.C. players
Seaham Red Star F.C. players
Premier League players
English Football League players
Northern Premier League players
English football managers
Seaham Red Star F.C. managers
Morpeth Town A.F.C. managers